Robert Loua is a former Guinean sprinter who competed in the men's 100m competition at the 1996 Summer Olympics. He recorded an 11.21, not enough to qualify for the next round past the heats.

References

Year of birth missing (living people)
Living people
Guinean male sprinters
Olympic athletes of Guinea
Athletes (track and field) at the 1988 Summer Olympics
Athletes (track and field) at the 1996 Summer Olympics
World Athletics Championships athletes for Guinea
Place of birth missing (living people)